Papel means paper in Portuguese language

Papel  may refer to:
 Pollyana Papel (born 1987), a Brazilian singer, songwriter and actress
 Papel people, an ethnic group from Guinea-Bissau
 The Papel language